SS A. J. Cermak was a Liberty ship built in the United States during World War II. She was named after Anton Cermak, an American politician. Cermak was the Mayor of Chicago from 1931 until his assassination in 1933 while meeting with President Franklin D. Roosevelt.

Construction
A. J. Cermak was laid down on 9 November 1943, under a Maritime Commission (MARCOM) contract, MCE hull 1836, by the Bethlehem-Fairfield Shipyard, Baltimore, Maryland; and was launched on 30 November 1943. Upon completion and delivery on 8 December 1943 to the War Shipping Administration (WSA) the ship was placed in operation Blidberg & Rothchild Co., Inc. as WSA agent under a General Agency Agreement.

History
A. J. Cermak was in the 37 ship convoy UGS-37 east of Algiers on the night of April 11/12 1944 when the convoy came under air attack. The ship was credited with one assist in shooting down an attacking aircraft.

On 16 March 1948, she was laid up in the National Defense Reserve Fleet, Wilmington, North Carolina. The ship had been under tow destined for the Military Sea Transportation Service but was diverted to lay up. Under award on 27 March 1964 the ship was sold for scrapping to Northern Metal Co., for $45,045. She was removed from the fleet on 11 April 1964.

References

Bibliography

  
 
 
 
 
 

 

Liberty ships
Ships built in Baltimore
1943 ships